M. S. Mahal (born 15 February 1951) is a former Indian cricket umpire. He stood in one ODI game in 2002.

See also
 List of One Day International cricket umpires

References

1951 births
Living people
Indian One Day International cricket umpires
Place of birth missing (living people)